Grandview Speedway is a one third-mile automobile race track located just east of Bechtelsville, Pennsylvania, United States. Featuring moderately high banks and a wide racing surface, it is suitable for close racing and passing. The track is sanctioned by NASCAR in the NASCAR Advance Auto Parts Weekly Series.

History
The track opened in 1963 and was built by Forrest Rogers after construction started in 1962. The track was originally planned as a ¼ mile (402 meters) asphalt track in Pottstown, Pennsylvania. Eventually this was changed to a larger dirt track in Bechtelsville, Pennsylvania. The track opened on August 11, 1963. Forrest Rogers died of a heart attack in 1966. His son, Bruce Rogers, took control of the race track and operated until he died in 2017. The Rogers family continues to operate the track.

Weekly races
It features a regular weekly series of modified, sportsman modified.

Special events
The track's signature event is the Freedom 76, a modified event in mid-September. The track has a date on the Pennsylvania Speedweeks of winged 410 sprint cars. Touring series that have raced at the track include: USAC National Sprint Cars, USAC National Midget cars, and All Star Circuit of Champions.

See also
 Bedford Speedway
 Eriez Speedway
 Lake Erie Speedway, Erie County, south of North East, Pennsylvania
 Nazareth Speedway
 Pocono Raceway

References

External links 

Grandview Speedway – Grandview Web

Buildings and structures in Berks County, Pennsylvania
Motorsport venues in Pennsylvania
Sports venues completed in 1963
1963 establishments in Pennsylvania